This list of birds of Wales includes every species of bird that has been recorded in a wild state in Wales. Compared to the avifauna of Britain as a whole, Wales has fewer breeding species, but these include a number of moorland species such as red grouse and black grouse, large numbers of seabirds (particularly on offshore islands such as Skomer, Grassholm and Bardsey) and good populations of several species typical of Welsh oak woods including redstart, pied flycatcher and wood warbler. Among the birds of prey is the red kite, which had become extinct in other parts of Britain until being reintroduced recently. In winter many wildfowl and waders are found around the coast, attracted by the mild temperatures. In spring and autumn a variety of migrant and vagrant birds can be seen, particularly on headlands and islands. Three-quarters of the UK population of the red-billed chough resides in Wales.

The list is based on Birds in Wales (Lovegrove et al. 1994), Birds in Wales 1992–2022 (Green 2022) and the list of the Welsh Ornithological Society (Prater & Thorpe 2006) with updates from the Welsh Records Panel's annual reports. The taxonomy and scientific names follow the official list of the British Ornithologists' Union (BOU). The English names are the vernacular names used in the 7th edition of the BOU list with the standardized names from that list given in brackets where they differ. The family introductions are based on The New Encyclopedia of Birds (Perrins 2004) except where otherwise stated. 

Certain categories of birds are noted with the following tags:

 (A) Accidental - a species that rarely or accidentally occurs in Wales
 (I) Introduced - a species introduced to Wales as a consequence, direct or indirect, of human actions

The total number of species on the list is 463 and 10 introduced species. About 150 species breed annually.

Ducks, geese and swans

Order: AnseriformesFamily: Anatidae

The swans, ducks and geese are medium to large birds that are adapted to an aquatic existence with webbed feet and bills which are flattened to a greater or lesser extent. In many ducks the male is colourful while the female is dull brown. The diet consists of a variety of animals and plants. The family is well represented in Wales, especially in winter when large numbers visit from Greenland, Scandinavia and Russia.

Pheasants, grouse, and allies
Order: GalliformesFamily: Phasianidae

These are terrestrial species, feeding and nesting on the ground. They are variable in size but generally plump, with broad and relatively short wings.

Nightjars and allies
Order: CaprimulgiformesFamily: Caprimulgidae

Nightjars are medium-sized nocturnal birds that usually nest on the ground. They have long wings, short legs and very short bills. Their soft plumage is cryptically coloured to resemble bark or leaves.

Swifts
Order: ApodiformesFamily: Apodidae

The swifts are small birds which spend the majority of their lives flying. These birds have very short legs and never settle voluntarily on the ground, perching instead only on vertical surfaces.

Bustards
Order: OtidiformesFamily: Otididae

Large, sturdy birds of open plains with long legs and necks and strong feet.

Cuckoos
Order: CuculiformesFamily: Cuculidae

Birds of variable size with slender bodies and long tails. Some species are known for laying their eggs in the nests of other birds.

Sandgrouse
Order: PterocliformesFamily: Pteroclidae

Sturdy, medium-sized birds with a small head and long, pointed wings.

Pigeons and doves

Order: ColumbiformesFamily: Columbidae

Pigeons and doves are stout-bodied birds with short necks and short slender bills with a fleshy cere.

Rails, gallinules, and coots
Order: GruiformesFamily: Rallidae

These birds mainly occupy dense vegetation in damp environments near lakes, marshes or rivers. Many are shy and secretive birds, making them difficult to observe. Most species have strong legs and long toes which are well adapted to soft uneven surfaces.

Cranes
Order: GruiformesFamily: Gruidae

Cranes are large, long-legged and long-necked birds. Unlike the similar-looking but unrelated herons, cranes fly with necks outstretched, not pulled back. Most have elaborate and noisy courting displays or "dances".

Grebes

Order: PodicipediformesFamily: Podicipedidae

Grebes are small to medium-large diving birds with lobed toes and pointed bills. They are seen mainly on lowland waterbodies and coasts. They feed on aquatic animals and nest on a floating platform of vegetation.

Stone-curlews
Order: CharadriiformesFamily: Burhinidae

A small family of medium to large waders with strong black bills, large yellow eyes and cryptic plumage.

Oystercatchers

Order: CharadriiformesFamily: Haematopodidae

The oystercatchers are large, obvious and noisy wading birds with strong bills used for smashing or prising open molluscs.

Stilts and avocets
Order: CharadriiformesFamily: Recurvirostridae

A family of fairly large wading birds. The avocets have long legs and long up-curved bills. The stilts have extremely long legs and long, thin, straight bills.

Plovers and lapwings

Order: CharadriiformesFamily: Charadriidae

Small to medium-sized wading birds with compact bodies, short, thick necks and long, usually pointed, wings.

Sandpipers and allies

Order: CharadriiformesFamily: Scolopacidae

A large, diverse family of wading birds. Different lengths of legs and bills enable multiple species to feed in the same habitat, particularly on the coast, without direct competition for food.

Pratincoles and coursers
Order: CharadriiformesFamily: Glareolidae

A family of slender, long-winged wading birds.

Gulls, terns, and skimmers

Order: CharadriiformesFamily: Laridae

Medium to large seabirds with grey, white and black plumage, webbed feet and strong bills. Many are opportunistic and adaptable feeders.

Skuas
Order: CharadriiformesFamily: Stercorariidae

Medium to large seabirds with mainly grey or brown plumage, sharp claws and a hooked tip to the bill. They chase other seabirds to force them to drop their catches.

Auks, murres, and puffins

Order: CharadriiformesFamily: Alcidae

A family of seabirds which are superficially similar to penguins with their black-and-white colours, their upright posture and some of their habits but which are able to fly. Great auks are extinct.

Divers
Order: GaviiformesFamily: Gaviidae

Divers are aquatic birds the size of a large duck, to which they are unrelated. They swim well and fly adequately but are almost hopeless on land, because their legs are placed towards the rear of the body. They feed on fish and other aquatic animals. They are all non-breeding visitors in Wales.

Southern storm petrels
Order: ProcellariiformesFamily: Oceanitidae

The austral storm petrels are the smallest seabirds, feeding on plankton and small fish picked from the surface, typically while hovering. They nest in colonies on the ground, most often in burrows.

Albatrosses
Order: ProcellariiformesFamily: Diomedeidae

The albatrosses are among the largest flying birds with long, narrow wings for gliding. The majority are found in the Southern Hemisphere with only vagrants occurring in the North Atlantic.

Northern storm petrels
Order: ProcellariiformesFamily: Hydrobatidae

The northern storm petrels are the smallest seabirds, feeding on plankton and small fish picked from the surface, typically while hovering. They nest in colonies on the ground, most often in burrows.

Petrels and shearwaters

Order: ProcellariiformesFamily: Procellariidae

These are highly pelagic birds with long, narrow wings and tube-shaped nostrils. They feed at sea on fish, squid and other marine life. They come to land to breed in colonies, nesting in burrows or on cliffs.

Storks
Order: CiconiiformesFamily: Ciconiidae

Storks are large, heavy, long-legged, long-necked wading birds with long stout bills and wide wingspans. They fly with the neck extended.

Boobies and gannets

Order: SuliformesFamily: Pelecanidae

Gannets are large seabirds that plunge-dive for fish and nest in large colonies. They have a torpedo-shaped body, long, narrow, pointed wings and a fairly long tail.

Cormorants and shags
Order: SuliformesFamily: Phalacrocoracidae

Cormorants are medium to large aquatic birds with mainly dark plumage and areas of coloured skin on the face. The bill is long, thin and sharply hooked for catching fish and aquatic invertebrates. They nest in colonies, usually by the sea.

Ibises and spoonbills
Order: PelecaniformesFamily: Threskiornithidae

A family of long-legged, long-necked wading birds. Ibises have long, curved bills. Spoonbils have a flattened bill, wider at the tip.

Herons and bitterns

Order: PelecaniformesFamily: Ardeidae

Herons and egrets are medium to large wading birds with long necks and legs. Bitterns tend to be shorter-necked and more secretive. They all fly with their necks retracted. The sharp bill is used to catch fish, amphibians and other animals. Many species nest in colonies, often in trees.

Osprey
Order: AccipitriformesFamily: Pandionidae

A large fish-eating bird of prey belonging to a family of its own. It is mainly brown above and white below with long, angled wings. It is mainly a passage migrant in Wales but has recently begun to breed.

Hawks, eagles, and kites

Order: AccipitriformesFamily: Accipitridae

A family of birds of prey which includes hawks, buzzards, eagles, kites and harriers. These birds have very large powerful hooked beaks for tearing flesh from their prey, strong legs, powerful talons and keen eyesight.

Barn owls

Order: StrigiformesFamily: Tytonidae

Barn owls are medium-sized to large owls with large heads and characteristic heart-shaped faces. They have long strong legs with powerful talons.

Owls
Order: StrigiformesFamily: Strigidae

Typical owls are small to large solitary nocturnal birds of prey. They have large forward-facing eyes and ears, a hawk-like beak and a conspicuous circle of feathers around each eye called a facial disc.

Hoopoes
Order: BucerotiformesFamily: Upupidae

A distinctive bird in its own family with a long curved bill, a crest, and black-and-white striped wings and tail.

Rollers
Order: CoraciiformesFamily: Coraciidae

A small family of colourful, medium-sized, birds with a crow-like shape that feeds mainly on insects.

Kingfishers

Order: CoraciiformesFamily: Alcedinidae

Kingfishers are medium-sized birds with large heads, long pointed bills, short legs and stubby tails. There are about 93 species worldwide, 2 in Britain and 1 in Wales.

Bee-eaters
Order: CoraciiformesFamily: Meropidae

A group of near-passerine birds characterised by richly coloured plumage, slender bodies and usually elongated central tail feathers.

Woodpeckers

Order: PiciformesFamily: Picidae

Woodpeckers are small to medium-sized birds with chisel-like beaks, short legs, stiff tails and long tongues used for capturing insects. Many woodpeckers have the habit of tapping noisily on tree trunks with their beaks.

Falcons and caracaras

Order: FalconiformesFamily: Falconidae

A family of small to medium-sized, diurnal birds of prey with pointed wings. They do not build their own nests and mainly catch prey in the air.

Shrikes
Order: PasseriformesFamily: Laniidae

Shrikes are passerine birds known for their habit of catching other birds and small animals and impaling the uneaten portions of their bodies on thorns. A typical shrike's beak is hooked, like a bird of prey.

Vireos
Order: PasseriformesFamily: Vireonidae

The vireos are a group of small to medium-sized passerine birds restricted to the New World.

Old World orioles
Order: PasseriformesFamily: Oriolidae

Orioles are colourful, medium-sized passerine birds with far-carrying, fluting songs.

Crows, jays, and magpies

Order: PasseriformesFamily: Corvidae

The crows and their relatives are fairly large birds with strong bills and are usually intelligent and adaptable.

Waxwings
Order: PasseriformesFamily: Bombycillidae

The waxwings are a group of passerine birds characterised by soft, silky plumage and unique red tips to some of the wing feathers.

Tits, chickadees, and titmice

Order: PasseriformesFamily: Paridae

Tits are mainly small, stocky, woodland species with short stout bills. They are adaptable birds, with a mixed diet including seeds and insects.

Penduline tits
Order: PasseriformesFamily: Remizidae

Small birds with finely pointed bills that build purse-like nests hanging from a branch.

Bearded tit
Order: PasseriformesFamily: Panuridae

This species, the only one in its family, is found in reed beds throughout temperate Europe and Asia.

Larks
Order: PasseriformesFamily: Alaudidae

Larks are small terrestrial birds with often extravagant songs and display flights. Most larks are fairly dull in appearance. Their food is insects and seeds.

Swallows

Order: PasseriformesFamily: Hirundinidae

The family Hirundinidae is adapted to aerial feeding. They have a slender streamlined body, long pointed wings and a short bill with a wide gape.

Bush warblers and allies
Order: PasseriformesFamily: Scotocercidae

The members of this family are found throughout Africa, Asia, and Polynesia. Their taxonomy is in flux, and some authorities place some genera in other families.

Long-tailed tits
Order: PasseriformesFamily: Aegithalidae

Small, long-tailed birds that typically live in flocks for much of the year.

Leaf warblers
Order: PasseriformesFamily: Phylloscopidae

Leaf warblers are a family of small insectivorous birds found mostly in Eurasia and ranging into Wallacea and Africa. The species are of various sizes, often green-plumaged above and yellow below, or more subdued with grayish-green to grayish-brown colors.

Reed warblers and allies
Order: PasseriformesFamily: Acrocephalidae

The members of this family are usually rather large for "warblers". Most are rather plain olivaceous brown above with much yellow to beige below. They are usually found in open woodland, reedbeds, or tall grass. The family occurs mostly in southern to western Eurasia and surroundings, but it also ranges far into the Pacific, with some species in Africa.

Grassbirds and allies 
Order: PasseriformesFamily: Locustellidae

Locustellidae are a family of small insectivorous songbirds found mainly in Eurasia, Africa, and the Australian region. They are smallish birds with tails that are usually long and pointed, and tend to be drab brownish or buffy all over.

Sylviid warblers, parrotbills, and allies
Order: PasseriformesFamily: Sylviidae

A group of small, insectivorous passerine birds. Most are of generally undistinguished appearance, but many have distinctive songs.

Kinglets
Order: PasseriformesFamily: Regulidae

The kinglets, also called crests, are a small group of birds often included in the Old World warblers, but frequently given family status because they also resemble the titmice.

Wrens

Order: PasseriformesFamily: Troglodytidae

Wrens are small and inconspicuous birds, except for their loud songs. They have short wings and thin down-turned bills.

Nuthatches
Order: PasseriformesFamily: Sittidae

Nuthatches are small woodland birds with the unusual ability to climb down trees head-first, unlike other birds which can only go upwards.

Treecreepers

Order: PasseriformesFamily: Certhiidae

Treecreepers are small woodland birds, brown above and white below. They have thin, pointed, down-curved bills, which they use to extricate insects from bark.

Mockingbirds and thrashers
Order: PasseriformesFamily: Mimidae

Medium-sized passerine birds with long tails. Some are notable for their ability to mimic sounds such as other birds' songs.

Starlings
Order: PasseriformesFamily: Sturnidae

Starlings are small to medium-sized passerine birds with strong feet. Their flight is strong and direct and most are very gregarious.

Thrushes and allies

Order: PasseriformesFamily: Turdidae

The thrushes and chats are plump, soft-plumaged, small to medium-sized insectivores or sometimes omnivores, often feeding on the ground. Many have attractive songs.

Old World flycatchers

Order: PasseriformesFamily: Muscicapidae

The flycatchers are small birds that fly out from a perch to catch insects in the air.

Dippers
Order: PasseriformesFamily: Cinclidae

Dippers are a group of perching birds whose habitat includes aquatic environments in the Americas, Europe and Asia. They are named for their bobbing or dipping movements.

Old World sparrows

Order: PasseriformesFamily: Passeridae

Sparrows tend to be small, plump, brownish or greyish birds with short tails and short, powerful beaks. They are seed-eaters and they also consume small insects.

Accentors
Order: PasseriformesFamily: Prunellidae

A small family of drab, unobtrusive, insectivorous birds with thin, pointed bills.

Wagtails and pipits

Order: PasseriformesFamily: Motacillidae

Motacillidae is a family of small passerine birds with medium to long tails. They are slender, ground-feeding insectivores of open country.

Finches, euphonias, and allies

Order: PasseriformesFamily: Fringillidae

Seed-eating passerine birds that are small to moderately large and have a strong beak, usually conical and in some species very large.

Longspurs and arctic buntings
Order: PasseriformesFamily: Calcariidae

The Calcariidae are a family of birds that had been traditionally grouped with the New World sparrows, but differ in a number of respects and are usually found in open grassy areas.

Old World buntings

Order: PasseriformesFamily: Emberizidae

The Emberizidae are a large family of seed-eating passerine birds with a distinctively shaped bill.

New World sparrows
Order: PasseriformesFamily: Passerellidae

Until 2017, these species were considered part of the family Emberizidae. Most of the species are known as sparrows, but these birds are not closely related to the Old World sparrows which are in the family Passeridae. Many of these have distinctive head patterns.

Troupials and allies
Order: PasseriformesFamily: Icteridae

A group of small to medium-sized, often colourful passerine birds restricted to the New World.

New World warblers

Order: PasseriformesFamily: Panuridae

A group of small, often colourful passerine birds restricted to the New World. Most are arboreal and insectivorous.

Cardinals and allies
Order: PasseriformesFamily: Cardinalidae

The cardinals are a family of robust, seed-eating birds with strong bills. They are typically associated with open woodland. The sexes usually have distinct plumages.

See also
List of birds of Great Britain
British avifauna
Lists of birds by region

Footnotes

References

British Birds Rarities Committee (2006) BBRC says goodbye to birders favourites. Accessed 22/04/08.
British Ornithologists' Union (2008) The British List: the official list of bird species recorded in Great Britain. . Accessed 22/04/08.
Clements, James F. (2007) The Clements Checklist of Birds of the World, 6th ed., Cornell University Press, Ithaca, New York.
Dudley, Steve P.; Mike Gee; Chris Kehoe; Tim M. Melling; The British Ornithologists' Union Records Committee (BOURC) (2006) The British List: A Checklist of Birds of Britain (7th edition), Ibis, 148 (3): 526–563.
Evans, Ceri (2003) Introduction to the species audit for Wales (phase 2) and species groups. Accessed 22/04/08.
Green, Jonathan (2022) Birds in Wales 1992–2022, Welsh Ornithological Society.
Lovegrove, Roger; Graham Williams & Iolo Williams (1994) Birds in Wales, T & AD Poyser Ltd, London.
O'Shea, Brian (2000) In Search of Birds in Wales, Skylark Books, Aberystwyth.
Perrins, Christopher, ed. (2004) The New Encyclopedia of Birds, Oxford University Press, Oxford.
Prater & Thorpe (2006) Welsh Species List. Accessed 22/04/08.
Pugh, Elfyn (2005) The Red Kite , Birds of Britain. Accessed 22/04/08.
Rogers, M. J. & the British Birds Rarities Committee (2004) Report on Rare birds in Great Britain in 2003, British Birds, 97:564.
Snow, D. W. & Perrins, C. M. (1998) Birds of the Western Palearctic: Concise Edition, Vol. 2, Oxford University Press, Oxford.
Tipling, David (1996) Top Birding Spots in Britain & Ireland, HarperCollins, London.
Welsh Records Panel (2006) Scarce and rare birds in Wales 2005. Accessed 22/04/08.
Welsh Records Panel (2007) Scarce and rare birds in Wales 2006. Accessed 22/04/08.

'birds
'Wales
Wales
birds
Wales
birds